Alf Olesen (19 April 1921 – 27 June 2007) was a Danish middle-distance runner. He competed in the men's 3000 metres steeplechase at the 1948 Summer Olympics.

References

External links

1921 births
2007 deaths
Athletes (track and field) at the 1948 Summer Olympics
Danish male middle-distance runners
Danish male steeplechase runners
Olympic athletes of Denmark
20th-century Danish people